Tiruppur North or 'Tiruppur (North)' is a state assembly constituency in Tiruppur district in Tamil Nadu, India newly formed after constituency delimitations 2008. Its State Assembly Constituency number is 113. It is included in the Tiruppur parliamentary constituency. Tiruppur North will be one of 17 assembly constituencies to have VVPAT facility with EVMs in 2016 Tamil Nadu Legislative Assembly election. It is one of the 234 State Legislative Assembly Constituencies in Tamil Nadu, in India.

Members of Legislative Assembly

Demographics
Kongu Vellalar Gounder, Senguntha Mudaliar and Adi Dravida communities are populated in this constituency.

Election results

2021

2016

2011

References 

Assembly constituencies of Tamil Nadu
Tiruppur